1942 in professional wrestling describes the year's events in the world of professional wrestling.

List of notable promotions 
Only one promotion held notable shows in 1942.

Calendar of notable shows

Notable events
June 26  Rodolfo Guzmán Huerta makes his debut as the silver masked ring character El Santo, which would go on to become one of the most famous names in lucha libre as well as starring in over 50 lucha films.

Championship changes

EMLL

Debuts
June 21:
Black Shadow
Enrique Llanes

Births
January 1  KY Wakamatsu 
January 17  Muhammad Ali (died in 2016) 
January 24  Gary Hart (wrestler)(died in 2008)
February 2  Masa Saito(died in 2018)
February 27  Seiji Sakaguchi
March 15  The Iron Sheik
April 10  Kurt Von Hess (died in 1999)
April 25  Mr. Hito (died in 2010)
April 28  Great Kojika
April 30  Devil Murasaki(died in 2017)
May 2  Jack Veneno (died in 2021) 
May 23  Donna Christianello(died in 2011)
June 12  Jim Wilson (wrestler) (died in 2009) 
June 18  Paul Jones(died in 2018)
June 24  Rudy Kay(died in 2008)
June 26  J. J. Dillon
July 8  El Supremo(died in 2010)
July 11  Jim White (wrestler) (died in 2010)
July 15  Mil Máscaras
July 22  Bob Roop 
August 6  Jimmy Valiant
August 8  Tony Condello
August 25  Ivan Koloff(died in 2017)
September 4  Jerry Jarrett(died in 2023) 
September 22  Ole Anderson
October 22  Pedro Morales(died in 2019)
November 6  Ken Patera
November 13  Walter Johnson (defensive tackle) (died in 1999) 
November 21  Afa Anoaʻi
November 22  Héctor del Mar (died in 2019) 
November 25  Blackjack Mulligan(died in 2015)
November 29  Gene Okerlund(died in 2019)

References

 
professional wrestling